Victoria Gouramma (sometimes spelt Gowramma in India or Gauromma in British newspapers of the period) (4 July 1841 – 30 March 1864) was an Indian princess.

Life

She was born in Benares, to Chikka Virarajendra (spelt "Veer Rajunder Wadeer" in English court proceedings), the ruler of Coorg who was deposed by the British under the command of James Stuart Fraser. Virarajendra surrendered on 24 April 1834 and was taken political prisoner to Benares. He went to England in March 1852 to demand in court that the East India Government return his wealth. Queen Victoria received the king with royal treatment and he left his daughter in the care of the queen.

Gowramma was placed under the care of Major Drummond and his wife who had travelled by ship along with the Raja. Gowramma was baptized on 5 July 1852 in a ceremony conducted at the Buckingham Palace by the Archbishop of Canterbury with the Queen as godmother (sponsor) giving her the name of Victoria.

In 1858 Queen Victoria asked Lena, Lady Login to find a suitor for her god daughter. There was an expectation that she would be a suitable wife for Duleep Singh, a deposed member of royalty, but he announced that he intended to marry an English woman. Lady Login tried to find a suitable European nobleman to become Gowramma's husband, but Gowramma married Lt. Col. John Campbell, who was 30 years older than her, despite the schemes. They had a daughter Edith Victoria Gouramma Campbell born on 2 July 1861. Gouramma died of tuberculosis in 1864 and was buried at Brompton cemetery. A marble bust was made of her by Baron Marochetti and is now at the Osborne House on the Isle of Wight. Edith Victoria married Henry Yardley, son of Sir W. Yardley, and had a son Victor.

References

External links
 The Matchmaker Queen
 A princess' tale
 

1841 births
1864 deaths
People from Kodagu district
Indian princesses